Micraegialia is a genus of beetle in family Scarabaeidae. It belongs to subfamily Aegialiinae. The genus contains only one known species, Micraegialia pusilla.

References

Scarabaeidae genera
Monotypic beetle genera